USS Mockingbird (AMc-28) was a coastal minesweeper acquired by the U.S. Navy for use in World War II. Her task was to clear minefields in coastal waterways.

The first Navy ship to be named Mockingbird,  AMc-28, a wooden dragger built in 1936 as Rio Douro by Morse Shipyards, Thomaston, Maine, was purchased by the U.S. Navy from L. C. McEwen and A. M. Pereira of Gloucester, Massachusetts, 30 October 1940; converted to a coastal minesweeper by the General Ship & Engine Works, East Boston, Massachusetts; renamed Mockingbird 14 November 1940; and placed in service at Boston 12 June 1941.

Mockingbird departed Boston 14 July 1941 for Yorktown, Virginia. Arriving there on the 18th, she underwent training at the Mine Warfare School and on 20 August reported for duty with the Experimental Mine Sweeping Group. She continued to operate in the 5th Naval District until 18 February 1944, when she was placed out of service at Norfolk, Virginia.

Struck from the Naval Register 29 July 1944, she was delivered to WSA for disposal at Little Creek, Virginia, 23 July 1945. Her subsequent status and fate are unknown.

References

External links 
 NavSource Online: Mine Warfare Vessel Photo Archive - Mockingbird (AMc 28)

Ships built in Thomaston, Maine
1936 ships
Minesweepers of the United States Navy
World War II minesweepers of the United States